Thailand's telephone numbering plan in Thailand is managed by the National Broadcasting and Telecommunications Commission (NBTC) in accordance with International Telecommunication Union's (ITU) recommendation E.164.

Geographic area codes

Geographic (fixed line) area codes are, excluding the STD prefix one digit in Bangkok and nearby provinces (area code 2) and two digits in all other provinces (area codes 3x, 4x, 5x, and 7x). In Thailand, an area code is usually shared by several provinces and roughly follows provincial borders.

Fixed-line subscriber numbers are six digits in Thailand (except Bangkok, Nonthaburi, Pathum Thani, and Samut Prakan, i.e., area code 2). Prior to 1980, subscriber numbers were six digits in Bangkok, Nonthaburi, Pathum Thani, and Samut Prakan. In 1980, subscriber numbers in these areas were expanded to seven digits in phases to meet new demands. The first digit of a subscriber number is associated with a specific locale within the area code. In Bangkok, Nonthaburi, Pathum Thani, and Samut Prakan, the second digit of a subscriber number identifies the service provider, which is almost always Telephone Organization of Thailand (TOT), as TOT holds a near-monopoly of the Thai fixed-line market.

Thus, a full national number is 9 digits, including the STD prefix 0. When writing a telephone number with the area code, the area code and subscriber number are separated by a hyphen, also in the middle of subscriber number. Examples:

A number 2134567 in Bangkok: 02-2134567
A number 213456 in Nakhon Ratchasima: 044-213456

Thailand switched to a closed dialing plan in 2021, which means that calling within the area code requires the area code to be dialed. E.g., When calling a number 2134567 in Bangkok (02) from a fixed-line phone:

Within Bangkok, Nonthaburi, Pathum Thani, and Samut Prakan: 02-2134567
Outside Bangkok, Nonthaburi, Pathum Thani, and Samut Prakan: 02-2134567
Outside Thailand: +66-2-2134567 (the initial 0 of the area code is omitted)

Mobile phone codes and IP telephony
Mobile phone codes are in area codes 8 and 9, and VoIP are in the area code 6, plus a second digit, resulting in two digits excluding the leading zero.

Originally, each mobile phone operator was issued one mobile phone code. Through a series of mergers, there are currently three major mobile phone operators: AIS, True and DTAC. As existing numbers run out, the three mobile phone operators are assigned numbers in code 081, distinguished by the first digit of the subscriber number.

A mobile phone number consists of a mobile phone code and a seven-digit subscriber number. Therefore, a mobile phone number is written as 0641163685

Mobile phones in Thailand use 900/1800 MHz for GSM. Domestic roaming service is available free within Thailand in places where there is only a single transmitter in place due to restrictions.

As codes are being exhausted, a new range, 09x, is available for assignment. Despite the length of the code, subscriber numbers are seven digits, resulting in a ten-digit national number including the leading zero. Starting 28 April 2011, the prefix 090 followed by seven digits was available for use.

Non-geographical short codes and special numbers

International dialling 
International dialling from Thailand follows the following pattern:
 Carrier selection code – Country calling code – Area code (if required, usually for landlines) – Subscriber number
Carrier selection codes, which direct the call via one of several providers, are as follows:

 001 – CAT Telecom
 003 – Advanced Wireless Network
 004 – Total Access Communication
 005 – AIN Globalcom
 006 – True Move
 009 – CAT Telecom (low cost, using VoIP)

Emergency numbers
 Thailand has nearly 100 "hotline" telephone numbers to call for assistance. They include 911 or 191 for emergencies, fire, or unwanted intruding animals; 1699 or 1669 (or 1646 or 1554 in Bangkok) for medical emergencies; tourist police, 1155; car theft, 1192; a taxi refusing a trip, 1584; road accidents, 1146.

References

Thailand
Telecommunications in Thailand
Telephone numbers